The 1997 Tri Nations Series was contested from 19 July to 23 August between the Australia, New Zealand and South Africa national rugby union teams. The All Blacks continued their unbeaten record to win their second tournament.

New Zealand won the Bledisloe Cup against Australia for the third year in a row. It took a 1–0 lead from the first test (played before the Tri-Nations), and the two Tri-Nations tests gave it a 3–0 final result.

Table

Results

External links
Tri Nations at Rugby.com.au
1997 Tri Nations Series at ESPN

Tri Nations Series
The Rugby Championship
Tri
Tri
Tri Nations